Ross Bridge is a bridge in Tasmania, Australia.

Ross Bridge may also refer to

Ross Bridge, Alabama, a neighborhood
Ross Bridge Golf Resort and Spa
Ross Bridge, a swing bridge in Penzance, Cornwall, England
Ross Bridge (North Yorkshire), a toll bridge in England

See also 
Rossbridge, a town in Victoria, Australia
Betsy Ross Bridge, a bridge between Philadelphia and New Jersey
Ross Island Bridge, a bridge in Oregon